Einar Lutro (born 27 July 1943) is a Norwegian politician for the Conservative Party.

He served as a deputy representative to the Norwegian Parliament from Hordaland during the term 2005–2009.

On the local level, he was the mayor of Ullensvang until 2003.

References

1943 births
Living people
Conservative Party (Norway) politicians
Deputy members of the Storting
Mayors of places in Hordaland
Place of birth missing (living people)
21st-century Norwegian politicians